Darin Goldberg is an American television writer and producer. He has worked on Wild Card, Strong Medicine, Time of Your Life, Push, Dawson's Creek, Fame L.A., Dangerous Minds, The Young and the Restless and New York Undercover.

Television credits

Writing
HawthoRNe
Strong Medicine
Wild Card
The Young and the Restless
Time of Your Life
Push
Dawson's Creek
Fame L.A.
Dangerous Minds
New York Undercover
Rizzoli & Isles
King & Maxwell
The Witches of East End

Producing
HawthoRNe
Strong Medicine
Time of Your Life
Dawson's Creek

References

External links

American soap opera writers
American television producers
American male television writers
Living people
Place of birth missing (living people)
Year of birth missing (living people)